The 2019 election for the Mayor of Fayetteville, North Carolina was held on November 5, 2019. Mayor Mitch Colvin, who was first elected in 2017, ran for re-election to a second term. No other candidate filed to run. Colvin was re-elected with 94.8% of the vote, with 5.2% of the vote going to various write-in candidates.

Candidates
Mitch Colvin, Mayor of Fayetteville since 2017

Results

References

Mayoral elections in Fayetteville, North Carolina
Fayetteville, North Carolina
Fayetteville mayoral